Liza Soars to the Skies  (Lízin let do nebe) is a 1937 Czechoslovak film directed by Václav Binovec. The film starred Josef Kemr.

References

External links
 

1937 films
1930s Czech-language films
Czech musical drama films
Czechoslovak musical drama films
1930s musical drama films
Czechoslovak black-and-white films
1937 drama films
Films directed by Václav Binovec
1930s Czech films